József Polics (born November 12, 1955) is a Hungarian civil engineer and politician, member of the National Assembly (MP) for Komló (Baranya County Constituency IV) between 2010 and 2014. He was a member of the Committee on Employment and Labour during that time. He has been the mayor of Komló since October 2010.

References

1955 births
Living people
Hungarian civil engineers
Mayors of places in Hungary
Members of the National Assembly of Hungary (2010–2014)
People from Pécs